The Dardanelles Gun or Great Turkish Bombard ( or simply Şahi) is a 15th-century siege cannon, specifically a super-sized bombard, which saw action in the 1807 Dardanelles operation. It was built in 1464 by Ottoman military engineer Munir Ali and modelled after Basillica, the Orban bombard that was used for the Ottoman besiegers of Constantinople in 1453.

History 
The powder chamber and the barrel are connected by the way of a screw mechanism, allowing easier transport of the unwieldy device.

Such super-sized bombards had been employed in Ottoman warfare and in Western European siege warfare since the beginning of the 15th century. According to Paul Hammer and Gábor Ágoston, the technology could have been introduced from other Islamic countries which had earlier used cannons. The Ottoman army successfully deployed large bombards at the siege of Salonica in 1430, and against the Hexamilion wall at the Isthmus of Corinth in 1446.

At the siege of Constantinople in 1453, the Ottomans employed a number of cannons, anywhere from 12 to 62. They were built at foundries that employed Turkish cannon founders and technicians, most notably Saruca, in addition to at least one foreign cannon founder, Orban. Most of the cannons at the siege were built by Ottoman engineers, including a large bombard by Saruca, while one cannon was built by Orban, who also contributed a large bombard. Orban was from Brassó, Kingdom of Hungary, before working for the Ottoman army in 1453. Ali's piece is assumed to have closely followed the outline of the large bombards used at the siege of Constantinople.

Along with other huge cannons, the Dardanelles Gun was still present for duty more than 340 years later in 1807, when a Royal Navy force appeared and commenced the Dardanelles Operation. Turkish forces loaded the ancient relics with propellant and projectiles, then fired them at the British ships. The British squadron suffered 28 casualties from this bombardment.

The gun was being considered for scrapping by 1850 but this was held off after John Henry Lefroy tried to get it added to the collection of Britain's Royal Military Depository. In 1866, on the occasion of a state visit, Sultan Abdulaziz gave the Dardanelles Gun to Queen Victoria as a present. It became part of the Royal Armouries collection and was displayed to visitors at the Tower of London. In 1989, it was moved to Fort Nelson, Hampshire, overlooking Portsmouth.

See also 
List of the largest cannon by calibre
Orban

Notes

Sources 
 Ffoulkes, Charles, "The 'Dardanelles' Gun at the Tower", Antiquarian Journal, Vol. 10 (1930), pp. 217–227
 Schmidtchen, Volker (1977a), "Riesengeschütze des 15. Jahrhunderts. Technische Höchstleistungen ihrer Zeit", Technikgeschichte 44 (2): 153–173 (153–157)
 Schmidtchen, Volker (1977b), "Riesengeschütze des 15. Jahrhunderts. Technische Höchstleistungen ihrer Zeit", Technikgeschichte 44 (3): 213–237 (226–228)

External links 

Artillery of the Ottoman Empire
630 mm artillery
History of the Dardanelles
Individual cannons
Siege artillery
Medieval artillery
Turkish inventions
1464